Jakob Michael Hagopian (October 20, 1913 – December 10, 2010) was an Armenian-born American Emmy-nominated filmmaker.

Biography
Hagopian was born to an Armenian family on 20 October 1913, in Kharpert, Mamuret-ul-Aziz Vilayet, Ottoman Empire. In summer of 1915, when the Ottoman soldiers rampaged through Kharpert, Michael's mother hid her child in a mulberry bush and prayed that the soldiers would not find him. Both escaped, and moved to Fresno, California.

Hagopian received an undergraduate degree from the University of California, Berkeley, and after receiving a doctorate in international relations from Harvard University, he went into cinema and founded the Atlantis Films Company, which produced over fifty documentary films on ethnic minorities and foreign lands. He won critical acclaim, including two Emmy nominations for his film The Forgotten Genocide, the first full-length feature on the Armenian genocide. The film encompassed twenty years of research and nearly 400 witness interviews.

In 1979, Hagopian founded the non-profit Armenian Film Foundation dedicated to preserving the visual and personal histories of the witnesses to the Armenian Genocide.

The pre-release version of Hagopian's  58-minute documentary "The River Ran Red" opened the Eighth Annual Arpa International Film Festival on Oct. 24, 2008 at the Egyptian Theatre in Hollywood, California, four days after Hagopian’s 95th birthday.

Other awards
Arpa Lifetime Achievement Award.
Armin T. Wegner Humanitarian Award, 2006.
Jewish World Watch's 'I Witness' Award.

Filmography

The Witnesses Trilogy
Part 3:
Part 2:
Part 1: 

 (Produced for the Curriculum Development and Supplemental Materials Commission of  the State of California.)

California Armenians: The First Generation
The Art of Traditional Armenian Cooking

Soviet Boy

References

External links
 Armenian Film Foundation (Official Website of the organization founded by Hagopian)
 Hagopian the Filmmaker on the website of the Armenian Film Foundation
 
 Hagopian at Armeniapedia
 95-year-old Award-Winning Filmmaker Completes 70th Documentary, PRWeb, October 15, 2008
 Award-Winning Filmmaker J. Michael Hagopian Dies at 97, Asbarez
 Obituary of Michael Hagopian, The Daily Telegraph, 20 December, 2010

1913 births
2010 deaths
People from Elazığ
People from Mamuret-ul-Aziz vilayet
Armenians from the Ottoman Empire
Emigrants from the Ottoman Empire to the United States
American film directors
Armenian refugees
University of California, Berkeley alumni
Harvard University alumni
American people of Armenian descent
Armenian genocide survivors